Conecuh may refer to:
Conecuh River
Conecuh County, Alabama
USS Conecuh (AOR-110)
Conecuh National Forest
Conecuh Ridge Whiskey
Conecuh Valley Railroad